Anchor Baby is a Nigerian thriller drama film written, directed and produced by Lonzo Nzekwe and starring Omoni Oboli, Sam Sarpong and Terri Oliver. At the 2010 Harlem International Film Festival in New York, the film won the award for Best Film and Omoni Oboli, the protagonist of the film, was awarded the Best Actress award. The film received two nominations at the 7th Africa Movie Academy Awards.

Plot 
A married Nigerian couple, Joyce and Paul Unanga, living illegally in the United States, has been ordered to leave the country by U.S. immigration. They decide that they will leave, but only after Joyce, who is five months pregnant, delivers her baby in the United States to guarantee automatic U.S. citizenship for their child. Thus ignoring the deportation order, the couple goes into hiding. When Paul is caught and deported, leaving Joyce to fend for herself, she struggles on her own to survive. Bureaucracy keeps getting in the way of Joyce achieving her goal and just as she is about to give up hope, she meets Susan, a married freelance writer who offers to help in the form of safe, free accommodation until the baby is born. With the help of her newfound friend, Joyce sets out to make the 'American Dream' come true for her unborn child.

Cast
 Omoni Oboli - Joyce Unanga
 Sam Sarpong - Paul Unanga
 Terri Oliver - Susan Backley

See also
 List of Nigerian films of 2010

References

External links
 
 

2010 films
English-language Nigerian films
2010 thriller drama films
Films about illegal immigration to the United States
Films shot in Ontario
Films set in the United States
Nigerian thriller drama films
2010 drama films
2010s English-language films